The unicorn leatherjacket (Aluterus monoceros) is a filefish of the family Monacanthidae, found around the world in subtropical oceans between latitudes 43° N and 35° S, at depths down to 50 m.  Its length is up to 76 cm.

Behavior
This species exhibits distinct pairing. Adults may form schools under weed rafts.

References

External links
 
 
 
 

Fish of Thailand
Monacanthidae
Fish of Hawaii
Fish of the Atlantic Ocean
Fish described in 1758
Taxa named by Carl Linnaeus